Noor-A-Madina Ahle Sunnat Mosque is a Sunni Islam mosque in Blackpool, Lancashire, England.

Facilities
Currently, there are two 200-person capacity buildings at the mosque; three remain under development. The mosque currently has a main prayer hall, a daily prayer hall, a ladies prayer room, multicultural centre, and a Quran classroom.

Events
The mosque holds a yearly event to celebrate the birthday of the Islamic prophet Muhammad. The event, celebrated across the world, is named Milad-Un-Nabi.

Noor-A-Madina Multi Cultural Centre
The multi-cultural centre offers many language and educational sessions such as Urdu, Polish, English, math, and Arabic to Muslims and non-Muslims.

References

External links
Official website

Mosques in Blackpool
Sunni mosques in England